Sebastopol is an unincorporated community in Trinity County, Texas, located on Farm-to-Market Roads 355 and 356, 14 miles southwest of Groveton. Although residents have said the population once reached 500, the population had decreased to around 120 by the 2000 census. 
Cody Johnson, country singer, is the most well-known person to come out of Sebastopol.
A grocery and bait store closed down in 2010 and two Dollar General stores were added recently.

References

Unincorporated communities in Texas
Unincorporated communities in Trinity County, Texas